Four ships of the United States Navy have been named USS Alaska in honor of  the territory acquired by the United States from Russia in 1867 which later became the state of Alaska:

 , a wooden-hulled screw sloop-of-war in commission from 1869 to 1883 that saw numerous small actions
 , a steam trawler chartered to serve as a minesweeper during World War I, in commission from 1918 to 1919
 , an Ohio-class ballistic missile submarine commissioned in 1986 and currently in service

See also

References

United States Navy ship names